Percy Francis Hobson (5 November 1942 – 4 January 2022) was an Australian high jumper. He won the men's event at the 1962 British Empire and Commonwealth Games in Perth, making him the first Indigenous Australian to earn a gold medal at the Commonwealth Games.

Early life
Hobson was born on 5 November 1942 in Bourke, New South Wales, to Fanny Williams and Percy Hobson. Fanny was the daughter of a respected NSW Police Aboriginal tracker, Frank Williams, who was a Ngemba man. One of ten children, Hobson was named Percy after his father and Francis after his grandfather and uncle who was killed on active service in Malaya around the time of his birth. His mother Fanny was from Brewarrina. During his youth Hobson trained using a makeshift high-jump.

Career
In doing so, he became the first Indigenous Australian to win a gold medal for Australia at the Commonwealth Games. Hobson received a hero's welcome when he returned to Bourke and the local brass band played "Hail, the Conquering Hero".

Death

Hobson died in Mooroolbark, Melbourne, Victoria, on 4 January 2022, at the age of 79.

Legacy  
A local park in Bourke was later renamed Percy Hobson Park in his honour.

A small standing exhibit on Hobson is at Bourke's The Back 'O Bourke Exhibition Centre.

On the park's water tower, a mural project was commenced prior to July 2020 to raise funds to paint a mural on the tower, supported by Hobson's sisters Freda Harvey and Heather Mieni. With the base coats applied, the mural started in April 2021, a re-creation of an iconic photo of the moment Hobson earned his first gold medal.

References

1942 births
2022 deaths
People from Bourke, New South Wales
Australian male high jumpers
Indigenous Australian track and field athletes
Commonwealth Games medallists in athletics
Commonwealth Games gold medallists for Australia
Athletes (track and field) at the 1962 British Empire and Commonwealth Games
Sportsmen from New South Wales
Medallists at the 1962 British Empire and Commonwealth Games